Sweepstakes Winner is a 1939 American comedy film directed by William C. McGann, written by John W. Krafft, and starring Marie Wilson, Johnnie Davis, Allen Jenkins, Charley Foy, Jerry Colonna and Frankie Burke. It was released by Warner Bros. on May 20, 1939.

Plot
A naive girl, Jennie, inherits $1,000 from her grandfather, who tells her to buy a particular racehorse with it. His instructions send her to two broke bookies. They tell her she need $5,000 to buy the horse and offer to bet it for her on a 5 to 1 horse in a race that day. That horse wins, but one of the bookies, Jinx Donovan, followed a bad tip and instead bet $500 on a loser. Rather than admit he lost the money, he arranges to have her robbed just after he returned the remaining $500 to her in a wad to look like the $5,000. Down to her last few dollars, Jennie gets a job as a waitress. The bookies eat a meal at the restaurant. Too broke to pay for it, they sell her an Irish Sweepstakes ticket for $10 and the meal. The ticket wins the first round, meaning she would win a huge cash prize if her horse won the sweepstakes race. She is offered cash for the ticket, but decided to rely on her luck instead.

Cast 
 Marie Wilson as Jennie Jones
 Johnnie Davis as Mark Downe
 Allen Jenkins as Xerxes 'Tip' Bailey
 Charley Foy as 'Jinx' Donovan
 Sam McDaniel as Mose
 Jerry Colonna as Nick
 Frankie Burke as Chalky Williams
 Vera Lewis as Mrs. McCarthy
 Granville Bates as Pop Reynolds
 Eddie Kane as Mr. Blake
 Bert Hanlon as Poolroom Guard
 George Lloyd as Dutch
 Sidney Bracey as Mr. Simpkins 
 Charles Irwin as English Radio Announcer
 Bernice Pilot as Martha (Uncredited)

References

Sources

External links
 
 
 
 

1939 films
1939 comedy films
American black-and-white films
American comedy films
Films directed by William C. McGann
American horse racing films
Warner Bros. films
1930s English-language films
1930s American films
English-language comedy films